The Memorial to the Fallen Heroes (Nay Pyi Taw) is a memorial in Nay Pyi Taw, Myanmar (Burma) to honour and enshrine the inscriptions of the name of Myanmar’s soldiers and civilians who heroically died in their fight for independence and counter-insurgency operations as well as those who died in doing notable and courageous actions for the country. It was opened in March 2017.

Memorial building 

The walls of the memorial have the names of 1,788 fallen soldiers and civilians who received gallantry titles and hero awards such as Hla Thaung, Ma Chit Po, Suk Bahadur Rai, Saw Ba Yi, Za Kaia, and fighter pilot Bo Peter.

List of notable visitors

See also 
 Martyrs' Mausoleum
 Kandawmin Garden Mausolea

References 

Military monuments and memorials
21st century in Naypyidaw
Buildings and structures in Naypyidaw
Mausoleums in Myanmar
Tourist attractions in Myanmar
Buildings and structures completed in 2017